Gerennus (Welsh: Geraint map Elidyr) was a legendary king of the Britons as recounted by Geoffrey of Monmouth. He was a son of King Elidurus and was succeeded by his son Catellus. According to Geoffrey, his descendants ruled Britain through the time of the Roman invasion of Britain.

References

Legendary British kings
3rd-century BC rulers